Microgyniidae is a small family of mites in the order Mesostigmata.

Species
Microgyniidae contains two genera, with four recognized species:

 Genus Microsejus Trägårdh, 1942
 Microsejus camini Trägårdh, 1942
 Genus Microgynium Trägårdh, 1942
 Microgynium incisum Krantz, 1961
 Microgynium rectangulatum Trägårdh, 1942
 Microgynium brasiliensis Wisniewski & Hirschmann, 1993

References

Mesostigmata
Acari families